30 Éxitos Insuperables (English 30 Insuperable Hits) is the fifth compilation album by Mexican pop singer Mijares.

Track listing
CD 1[]:
 María Bonita
 Corazón Salvaje
 Con un Nudo en la Garganta
 Bella
 No Hace Falta
 No Se Murió el Amor
 Poco a Poco
 Siempre
 La Quiero a Morir
 Baño de Mujeres
 Para Amarnos Más
 Persona a Persona
 A Corazón Abierto
 Soldado del Amor
 Alfonsina y el mar

CD 2
 Que Nada Nos Separe
 Amor "Amori"
 Me Accordaré de Ti
 Piel Canela
 El Rey de la Noche
 El Amor No Tiene Fronteras
 Mujer
 Quizá, Quizá, Quizá
 Volverás
 Bonita
 Uno Entre Mil
 Ansiedad
 El Breve Espacio
 Cuatro Veces Amor (duet with Lucero)
 Encadenado

Manuel Mijares compilation albums
2003 greatest hits albums